Tuku Township is an urban township in Yunlin County, Taiwan.

Geography
It has a population total of 27,662 and an area of 46 km2.

Administrative divisions
The township comprises 17 villages: Beijiao, Beiping, Dapei, Fenqi, Gongbei, Houpu, Lunnei, Nanping, Shimiao, Shuntian, Tungping, Xibian, Xingxin, Xinzhuang, Xiping, Yuegang and Zhongzheng.

Tourist attractions
 Chungsan Street
 Tuku Night Market

Notable natives
 Chang Li-shan, Magistrate of Yunlin County

References

Townships in Yunlin County